Mỹ Phú may refer to several places in Vietnam, including:

Mỹ Phú, Đồng Tháp, a ward of Cao Lãnh city
Mỹ Phú, An Giang, a commune of Châu Phú District
Mỹ Phú, Long An, a commune of Thủ Thừa District

See also
Mỹ Phú Đông, a commune of Thoại Sơn District in An Giang Province